The South American dwarf gecko (Lygodactylus wetzeli) is a species of lizard in the family Gekkonidae. The species is endemic to South America.

Etymology
The specific name, wetzeli, is in honor of American mammalogist Ralph M. Wetzel.

Geographic range
L. wetzeli is found in eastern Bolivia, midwestern Brazil, and northern Paraguay.

Habitat
The preferred natural habitat of L. wetzeli is savanna.

Reproduction
L. wetzeli is oviparous.

References

Further reading
Bons J, Pasteur G (1977). "Solution histologique à un problème de taxinomie herpétologique interessants les rapports paléobiologiques de l'Amerique du Sud et de l'Afrique". C. R. Acad. Sci. Paris 284 (D): 2547–2550. (Lygodactylus wetzeli, new combination). (in French).
Rösler H (2000). "Kommentierte Liste der rezent, subrezent und fossil bekannten Geckotaxa (Reptilia: Gekkonomorpha)". Gekkota 2: 28–153. (Vanzoia wetzeli, p. 120). (in German).
Smith HM, Martin RL, Swain TA (1977). "A new genus and two new species of South American geckos (Reptilia: Lacertilia)". Papéis Avulsos de Zoologia, Museu de Zoologia da Universidade de São Paulo 30: 195–213. (Vanzoia wetzeli, new species, p. 196).

Lygodactylus
Reptiles described in 1977